The Miss South Carolina World competition is a beauty pageant that selects the representative for South Carolina in the Miss World America pageant.

The current Miss South Carolina World is Megan Gordon of North Augusta.

Winners 
Color key

Notes to table

References

External links

South Carolina culture
Women in South Carolina